Ffynone (Welsh: Ffynnonau) is a mansion and estate near Boncath, Pembrokeshire, Wales, in the parish of Manordeifi. The original Georgian design was by the architect John Nash, and the house was later remodelled by Inigo Thomas. It is a Grade I listed building, and its gardens and park are also listed, at Grade I, on the Cadw/ICOMOS Register of Parks and Gardens of Special Historic Interest in Wales.

History

The name predates the present house, and its Welsh name Ffynnonau, meaning "Wells",  reflects the existence of a number of springs in the vicinity.

In 1752 Captain Stephen Colby bought the Ffynone estate from the Morgan family of Blaenbwlan. The house, completed in 1799, was repaired in 1828 by W. Hoare and Son of Lawrenny. In the 1830s, the estate extended to 237 acres in the Manordeifi parish,  with further land in adjacent parishes. The parkland around the house was some thirty acres. There were many additions and improvements over the following years to both the house and the estate.

The property was passed down in the Colby family to John Vaughan Colby, whose wife in 1902 commissioned the architect and garden designer Inigo Thomas to remodel the house and lay out the terraced gardens, work which was completed in 1907.

John Vaughan Colby died in 1919. He had no son and left the estate to his daughter Aline Margaret, who had married Captain Cecil John Herbert Spence-Jones, son of the Dean of Gloucester, in 1908; the marriage was a notable occasion, reported in great detail, an occasion for local celebration, despite there being no guests at the wedding and no reception, owing to the bride's mother's state of health. Spence-Jones took the additional surname of Colby by royal licence in 1920. In 1927, the property  was sold to a Glamorgan business man.

After the death of the 3rd Earl in 2010, the house was put up for sale with a guide price of £2.5 million.

The estate records (to 1919) are held at the National Library of Wales.

Architecture
John Nash was commissioned to design the house in the early 1790s; construction work began in 1794 and was completed by 1799. Materials included locally quarried stone as well as stone from other parts of Britain. The house was laid out to a classical Georgian plan. 60,000 trees were sourced from John Mackie, a Norwich nursery man, and hundreds of tons of topsoil were brought in. Inigo Thomas, in contrast, remodelled the house in the style of an Italian palazzo. He added the east and west wings, creating a library and an ornate dining room and music room with a cross vaulted tunnel roof.

In January 1952, the house was designated as a Grade I listed building, while in November 1994 a number of other structures on the estate were listed at Grade I, II*, or II. They are:
Entrance gates and piers (Grade II)
Game-Larder to N of Service Ranges (Grade II)
Garden Fountain N of Walled Garden (Grade II)
Gatepiers, Steps and Walls to N Court (Grade II)
Large Arched Outbuilding on NW Side of Ffynone Farmyard (Grade II)
Stable and Kitchen Court (Grade I)
Sundial on W Lawn (Grade II)
Terrace Wall and Balustrade to W Garden (Grade II)
Terrace, Walls and Balustrades S of Ffynone (Grade II*)
The Gazebo, at the Garden House (Grade II)

The gardens and parkland at Ffynone are designated Grade I on the Cadw/ICOMOS Register of Parks and Gardens of Special Historic Interest in Wales.

References

External links
National Gardens Scheme: Ffynone

Grade I listed buildings in Pembrokeshire
Grade II listed buildings in Pembrokeshire
Grade II* listed buildings in Pembrokeshire
John Nash buildings
Country houses in Pembrokeshire
Georgian architecture in Wales
Registered historic parks and gardens in Pembrokeshire